Ikeda is the 26th most common Japanese surname. Notable people with the surname include:

, Japanese songwriter and singer
, Japanese voice actress
, founder of Soka University of America and president of Soka Gakkai International (SGI)
, Japanese professional wrestler
Fumiyo Ikeda (born 1962), Japanese dancer, actress and choreographer
, Japanese politician and the 58th, 59th and 60th Prime Minister of Japan
, Aikido shihan
, film director
Jon Ikeda (born 1965), American-born automobile designer and executive
, actor
, Japanese ambassador and chief of ITER
, Japanese footballer
, Tokyo Imperial University professor, discoverer of the umami flavor
, Japanese racewalker
, Japanese painter
, Japanese voice actress
, Japanese aikido teacher
, Japanese-Turkish mathematician
, Japanese manga artist
, Japanese sound artist
, Japanese women's footballer
, Japanese physician, "father" of fiberoptic bronchoscopy
, Japanese badminton player
, voice actor
Suzee Ikeda (born 1947), American-born singer and record executive
, daimyō
, Japanese engineer and computer scientist
, daimyō and military commander
, Japanese politician
, Japanese actress
Yukiko Ikeda (born 1971), Japanese archer

References

Japanese-language surnames